The Venetian regional election of 1975 took place on 15 June 1975. Ten new seats were added to the Regional Council following the 1971 census.

Events
Christian Democracy was by far the largest party, securing a full majority. After the election, Christian Democrat Angelo Tomelleri was re-elected President of the Region at the head of a coalition comprising also the Italian Republican Party, which anyway left in 1977.

Results

Source: Regional Council of Veneto

References

Elections in Veneto
1975 elections in Italy